The 90th district of the Texas House of Representatives contains a portion of Tarrant county. The current Representative is Ramon Romero Jr., who was first elected in 2014.

References 

90